The Filthy Lucre Tour was the 1996 reunion tour of the pioneering British punk rock band Sex Pistols. The 78-date world tour lasted for almost six months.

A live album, Filthy Lucre Live, was recorded at Finsbury Park in London and reached #26 in the UK charts. A live version of the song "Pretty Vacant" was released as a single in July, making #18.

Tour dates

Cancelled dates

References

Sex Pistols concert tours
1996 concert tours
Reunion concert tours